The Center for Free Enterprise (in Korean 자유기업원) is a libertarian, formerly neoconservative, think-tank based in Seoul, South Korea. Although the CFE was originally established upon the libertarian belief according to the philosophy of Friedrich Hayek and Ludwig von Mises, in later years, it expressed neoconservative, authoritarian or even McCarthyist ideas. For example, CFE enthusiastically advocated the nationalization of history textbooks in Korea, which was mainly discussed under the Park Geun-hye administration. Some libertarian scholars considered that the CFE had ruined libertarian ideas. However, after the impeachment of the Park administration, in 2017, the CFE changed its name from "자유경제원" to "자유기업원," endeavoring to exclude authoritarian and un-libertarian ideas and to become the true libertarian think tank of Korea.

References

External links
 Center for Free Enterprise official website (Korean)
 Center for Free Enterprise official website (English)
 FreeNet News CFE interactive media site (Korean)

Libertarian think tanks
Conservatism in South Korea
Liberalism in South Korea
Right-wing politics in South Korea
Political and economic think tanks based in South Korea
Think tanks based in South Korea
Libertarianism in Asia